is a Japanese lyrical singer (soprano).

Beginning of career 
After studying singing at the Tokyo University of the Arts, Isshiki, fascinated by French music, moved to Paris in 1996 to complete her studies at the École Normale de Musique de Paris.

Her professional career in Europe began with the Accentus vocal ensemble (from 1996 to 2001).

Thanks to her powerful vocal technique, her musical balance, her sensitivity and her crystalline voice timbre, Isshiki is quickly recommended as a concert soloist, particularly for the Baroque, modern and contemporary music.

Vocal and choir ensembles 

She regularly performs with the ensembles  (since 2001), the Nederlands Kamerkoor (since 2003), the Ensemble européen William Byrd (since 2005) and the Ludus Modalis (since 2008).

Soloist career 
Isshiki is frequently invited as a solo singer for vocal ensembles (see above) or instrumental ensembles such as the Ensemble InterContemporain, Il Seminario Musicale, the Ensemble 2e2m, the Baroque Graffiti...

She offers, accompanied by a pianist, a personal recital of works crossed between East and West: Debussy, Poulenc, Fauré, Sadao Bekku, Hideo Kobayashi, and Hikaru Hayashi.

References

External links 
 video: Dominique Lemaître Sur l'île ovale de couleur bleue (Oct.2015)
 video: Patrick Burgan "Les sommeils de Sappho (Apr.2014)
 Website of Prod-S
 Discography on Discogs

Japanese operatic sopranos
Tokyo University of the Arts alumni
École Normale de Musique de Paris alumni
Date of birth missing (living people)
Place of birth missing (living people)
Living people
Year of birth missing (living people)